Amblyptilia punoica is a moth of the family Pterophoridae that is known from Peru.

Adults are on wing from end March to the beginning of April.

References

Amblyptilia
Moths described in 1996
Endemic fauna of Peru
Moths of South America